Courthouse Place, also known as the Cook County Criminal Court Building, is a Richardsonian Romanesque-style building at 54 West Hubbard Street in the Near North Side of Chicago.  Now an office building, it originally served as a noted courthouse. Designed by architect Otto H. Matz and completed in 1893, it replaced and reused material from the earlier 1874 criminal courthouse at this site (the location of the trial and hangings related to the Haymarket Affair).  The complex included in addition to the successive courthouses, the Cook County Jail, and a hanging gallows for prisoners sentenced to death.  By the 1920s the attached jail, which was behind the courthouse and no longer exists, had a capacity for 1200 inmates but sometimes housed twice that and the court rooms were backlogged with cases.

For its first 35 years, the present Courthouse Place building housed the Cook County Criminal Courts and was the site of many legendary trials, including the Leopold and Loeb murder case, the Black Sox Scandal, and the jazz age trials that formed the basis of the play and musical Chicago. Newspapermen Ben Hecht and Charles MacArthur based much of their 1928 play, The Front Page, on the daily events in this building.  Other authors of Chicago's 1920s literary renaissance who were employed in the fourth floor pressroom include Carl Sandburg, Sherwood Anderson, and Vincent Starrett. The building was listed on the National Register of Historic Places on November 13, 1984 and designated a Chicago Landmark on June 9, 1993.

In 1929, the Criminal Courts left the 54 West Hubbard Street location as did the Cook County Jail, and the building was then occupied by the Chicago Board of Health and other city agencies. After poor alterations and years of neglect, the building was acquired by a private developer, Friedman Properties, Ltd in 1985.  The property was restored and refurbished as "Courthouse Place," an office development later expanded to include the restoration of other surrounding historic buildings.

Gallery

See also
Chicago Landmark

Notes

Government buildings completed in 1893
Chicago Landmarks
Government buildings on the National Register of Historic Places in Chicago
Former courthouses in Illinois
County courthouses in Illinois
Richardsonian Romanesque architecture in Illinois
Courthouses on the National Register of Historic Places in Illinois